The Little Thetford flesh-hook is a late Bronze-Age (1150950 BC) artefact discovered in 1929 in Little Thetford, near Ely, Cambridgeshire, England. A flesh-hook is a metal hook with a long handle used to pull meat out of a pot or hides out of tan-pits. This particular find is one of 32 other such archaeologically significant finds, scatters, and excavations within  of Little Thetford.

Discovery 
The artefact was found by a Mr. Dresser, whilst digging a ditch on reclaimed fenland, at Little Thetford in 1929. Discovered about  down, it consisted of two-parts, connected by the remains of a wooden shaft. The wood remains have not survived; a contemporary wooden shaft has been added by the British Museum for display purposes. The artefact is in the British Museum though is not, as of 2012, on display. Within  of Little Thetford, there have been 33 finds of various kinds over the years, such as flints from the Neolithic era through to a windmill of the late Medieval period.

Uses 
The word flesh-hook is relatively modern. The OED gives the origin of the word as 1325 AD, and defines it as a metal hook with a long stail, used to pull hides out of tan-pits or as a hook for pulling meat from the pot. It may also have been used as a tool to prod animals. The use of this flesh-hook in the Bronze Age can only be speculated.

Construction 
The metal used in the construction is a bronze alloy, found to be typical of the late Bronze Age. The material was analysed using ICPAES and contained (approximately) 85% copper, 10% tin, 3% lead, and 2% impurities; although the constituents of the individual parts varied around these figures. From an analysis of 36 other Bronze-Age flesh-hooks known to be in existence, the assembled length of hook-part, butt-end, and missing wood part is speculated to be .

The artefact was manufactured by casting, using a mould in a lost-wax (cire perdue) process.

Dating 

The British Museum dates the artefact within the Bronze Age 1150950 BC. The Cambridgeshire Historic Environment Record database dates the artefact as late Bronze Age 1000–701 BC.

See also 
 Dunaverney flesh-hook
 Lost wax casting

References

External links 
 Introduction to Bronze age
 Lost wax casting explained

Archaeological artifacts
Bronze Age England
Prehistoric objects in the British Museum
Bronzeware
History of Cambridgeshire
Bronze Age Europe